Agostino Ghirlanda, also known as da Fivizzano, (16th century) was an Italian painter.

Biography
He was born in Massa, and active there, as well as in Lucca and Pisa. He first married in 1576, and was painting frescoes in Massa in 1584. he painted frescoes for the  "Loggetta" in the Palazzo dell'Opera found flanking Piazza dei Miracoli in Pisa.

References

16th-century Italian painters
Italian male painters
Italian Renaissance painters
Year of birth unknown
Year of death unknown
Painters from Tuscany